Uzhanis is a village in the Kapan Municipality of the Syunik Province in Armenia.

Demographics 
The National Statistical Service of the Republic of Armenia (ARMSTAT) reported its population was 87 in 2010, down from 136 at the 2001 census.

References 

Populated places in Syunik Province